The Shumaker Naval Ammunition Depot was a munitions manufacturing facility of the United States Navy located in Calhoun and Ouachita counties in southern Arkansas.  It operated from 1945 until 1957, producing Sidewinder missiles and other weapons.  The property was sold off in 1961.  Part of the original site now houses Southern Arkansas University Tech.  Two of its surviving buildings, the 500-Man Barracks and the Administration Building, were listed on the National Register of Historic Places in 2018.

At the time of construction, the depot was planned to be a 110 square mile site serving as the "principal rocket loading, assembly, and storage plant" for the United States, with a permanent complement of 5000 personnel.

Other naval munitions plants
Other inland naval munitions plants were located at Naval Ammunition Depot, Crane in Burns City, Indiana, McAlester Naval Depot in McAlester, Oklahoma and the Hawthorne Naval Ammunition Depot in Hawthorne, Nevada.

See also
National Register of Historic Places listings in Calhoun County, Arkansas

References

Weapons and ammunition installations of the United States Navy
Ammunition depots of the U.S. Department of Defense
Military facilities on the National Register of Historic Places in Arkansas
Military installations closed in 1957
National Register of Historic Places in Calhoun County, Arkansas
Closed installations of the United States Navy
Barracks on the National Register of Historic Places
Cold War military installations of the United States